Amara, usually distinguished as Amara East and Amara West, is the modern name of an ancient Egyptian city in Nubia, in what today is Sudan. Amara West is located on the west side of the Nile, eastern Amara, on the eastern side of the Nile. The towns lie north of the 3rd Cataract of the Nile, near the modern-day town of Abri.

Amara West
Amara West was founded in the 19th Dynasty by Seti I and was probably, at least temporarily, an administrative center. Here was the official residence of the representative of Kush. The fortified city was about 200 x 200 m. Here stood a great temple of Ramesses II, excavated between 1938 and 1950. The town's name was first per-Menmaatre (House of Seti I), was then in Per-Rameses-meri-Amon (House of Ramesses II), and finally changed to Chenem-Waset.

The place is under excavation since 2008 by a team of the British Museum under Neil Spencer.

Amara East
Amara East was significant in the Meroitic period. The Meroitic name was Pedeme. Here was a temple built by Natakamani. The Lepsius expedition still saw and partially documented eight decorated pillars. Today, only a few remnants of the city walls exist.

References

Archaeological sites in Sudan
Kingdom of Kush